The Quintin Blair House in Cody, Wyoming was designed by Frank Lloyd Wright and built in 1952–53. The house is an example of Wright's "natural house" theme, emphasizing close integration of house and landscape. It is the only Wright building in Wyoming.

Ruth Taggart Blair was a student at the Chicago Academy of Fine Arts during the 1930s.  Her professor, Bruce Goff, took the class to visit Taliesin at Spring Green, Wisconsin, where they met Wright. In 1951 Ruth and Quintin Blair were visiting Arizona, when Ruth suggested that they visit Taliesin West in Arizona, Wright's winter home. They were met by Wright in the driveway, introduced themselves, and were invited to stay for lunch.  At the luncheon, Wright expressed a desire to design a house for them, as he had no buildings in Wyoming. At Wright's suggestion, the Blairs bought some land away from town, as Wright did not want to design for a city lot. The house was completed in 1953.

The house is dominated by a low, nearly flat roof that flares dramatically over the living room, where three sides of the room are floor-to-ceiling glass. The windows have mitered corners, eliminating a support and giving the impression that the glass itself incorporates a right-angle bend. A small triangular bay projects from the glass wall as a piano niche, a common Wright element. Exterior wall materials are primarily locally quarried ashlar sandstone.

Springs near the house have been dammed by a wall aligned with the piano bay's angled wall, forming a small pond. The house has been modified and somewhat enlarged, with consultation from Taliesin.

The Blair House was placed on the National Register of Historic Places in 1991.

References

 Storrer, William Allin. The Frank Lloyd Wright Companion. University Of Chicago Press, 2006,  (S.351)

External links
 at the National Park Service's NRHP database
Quintin Blair House at the Wyoming State Historic Preservation Office

Houses on the National Register of Historic Places in Wyoming
Houses completed in 1953
Houses in Park County, Wyoming
Frank Lloyd Wright buildings
Cody, Wyoming
National Register of Historic Places in Park County, Wyoming